Larry Kaplan is an American game designer who was the co-founder of Activision.

Kaplan studied at the University of California, Berkeley from 1968 through 1974 and graduated with a degree in Computer Science. 

He started at Atari, Inc. in August 1976 and wrote games for the Atari Video Computer System. Kaplan also worked on the Atari 400/800 operating system. He co-founded Activision in late 1979. Since leaving Activision in 1982, Kaplan has worked at Amiga, Atari Games, Silicon Graphics, Worlds of Wonder, and MicroUnity.

He was hired as Lead Technical Director on the 1998 movie Antz, but stayed with the project for only a few months.

Credits 

Kaplan wrote the following Atari 2600 games:<ref
name="AtariAge"></ref>
 Air-Sea Battle (1977, Atari) one of the nine Atari 2600 launch titles
 Street Racer (1977, Atari) one of the nine Atari 2600 launch titles
 Brain Games (1978, Atari)
 Bowling (1979, Atari)
 Bridge (1981, Activision)
 Kaboom! (1981, Activision)

References

External links

Listing of Kaplan's library of work at AtariAge
Interview with Larry Kaplan at Digital Press

Living people
Year of birth missing (living people)
University of California, Berkeley alumni
American video game designers
Video game programmers
American computer programmers
Game Developers Conference Pioneer Award recipients